HMS Roebuck was a Hawthorn Leslie three-funnel, 30-knot destroyer ordered by the Royal Navy under the 1898–1899 Naval Estimates. She was the twelfth ship to carry the name. She served during World War I and was broken up in 1919.

Description and construction
On 30 March 1899, the British Admiralty ordered three destroyers (Roebuck,  and ) from the Newcastle shipbuilder Hawthorn Leslie, as part of the 1898–1899 shipbuilding programme.

The three ships closely resembled the two thirty-knotter destroyers,  and  built by Hawthorn Leslie under the 1896–1897 programme. Displacement was  light and  full load. The ship had the standard armament of the Thirty-Knotters, i.e. a QF 12-pounder 12 cwt ( calibre) gun on a platform on the ship's conning tower (in practice the platform was also used as the ship's bridge), with a secondary armament of five 6-pounder guns, and two  torpedo tubes. The ship was manned by 63 officers and ratings.

Roebuck was laid down on 2 October 1899 at Hawthorn Leslie's  Hebburn-on-Tyne shipyard and launched on 4 January 1901. She was completed and accepted by the Royal Navy in March 1902.

Service history
After commissioning she was assigned to the Channel Fleet. She spent her operational career mainly in home waters. In May 1902 she received the officers and men from HMS Greyhound, and was commissioned by Commander Marcus Rowley Hill at Chatham for service with the Medway Instructional Flotilla. She took part in the fleet review held at Spithead on 16 August 1902 for the coronation of King Edward VII. In August 1906, Roebuck, part of the 3rd Destroyer Flotilla, was due to be refitted at Devonport Dockyard. In 1910, Roebuck, commanded by Andrew Cunningham, later Admiral of the Fleet and First Sea Lord, was part of the 4th Destroyer Flotilla based at Portsmouth.

On 30 August 1912 the Admiralty directed all destroyers were to be grouped into classes designated by letters based on contract speed and appearance. As a three-funneled destroyer with a contract speed of 30 knots, Roebuck was assigned to the C class. The class letters were painted on the hull below the bridge area and on a funnel.

She was deployed to Devonport under orders of the Commander in Chief, Portsmouth for the training of cadets until the Armistice.

By December 1918 she was paid off and laid-up in reserve awaiting disposal.  She was broken up at Portsmouth Dockyard in 1919.

Pennant numbers

Notes

Citations

Bibliography
 
 
 
 
 
 
 
 
 
 
 

 

Ships built on the River Tyne
1901 ships
C-class destroyers (1913)
World War I destroyers of the United Kingdom
Greyhound-class destroyers